H59 may refer to:
 , a Royal Navy G-class destroyer
 Nelson H-59, an aircraft engine produced by Nelson Aircraft
 Sikorsky H-59, an American experimental helicopter